Anadenanthera peregrina var. peregrina is a tree in the family Fabaceae.  It is native to Guyana, Venezuela, Brazil, Colombia and it is also found in the Caribbean.

Entheogen
In South America, Anadenanthera peregrina var. peregrina is used to make nopolyopo, a shamanic snuff.

Chemical components
Bufotenine is in the seeds.

This variety appears to be much higher in N,N-DMT than other types of Anadenanthera.

This strain is best for entheogenic use.

References 

peregrina var. peregrina